Langenwaldschanze is a ski jumping normal hill in Schonach im Schwarzwald, Germany.

History
It was opened in 1924 and owned by SC Schonach. It hosted two FIS Ski jumping World Cup events for ladies. Ryota Yamamoto holds the hill record with 111 m.

See also
 Schwarzwaldpokal

References

Ski jumping venues in Germany
Buildings and structures in Schwarzwald-Baar-Kreis
Sports venues completed in 1924
1924 establishments in Germany
Sports venues in Baden-Württemberg
Black Forest